Stvolínky is a municipality and village in Česká Lípa District in the Liberec Region of the Czech Republic. It has about 300 inhabitants.

Administrative parts
Villages and hamlets of Kolné, Novina, Stvolínecké Petrovice and Taneček are administrative parts of Stvolínky.

References

Villages in Česká Lípa District